Georgetown is a village in Brown County, Ohio, United States located about 36 miles southeast of Cincinnati. The population was 4,331 at the 2010 census. It is the county seat of Brown County. Georgetown was the childhood home of Ulysses S. Grant.

History
Georgetown was platted in 1819. The village took its name from Georgetown, Kentucky. A post office called Georgetown has been in operation since 1821.

Geography
Georgetown is located at  (38.866926, −83.902590).

Demographics

2010 census
As of the census of 2010, there were 4,331 people, 1,722 households, and 1,085 families living in the village. The racial makeup of the village was 95.5% White, 1.9% African American, 0.3% Native American, 0.5% Asian, 0.2% from other races, and 1.6% from two or more races. Hispanic or Latino of any race were 0.6% of the population.

There were 1,722 households, of which 34.6% had children under the age of 18 living with them, 41.6% were married couples living together, 15.7% had a female householder with no husband present, 5.7% had a male householder with no wife present, and 37.0% were non-families. 32.7% of all households were made up of individuals, and 14.8% had someone living alone who was 65 years of age or older. The average household size was 2.36 and the average family size was 2.93.

The median age in the village was 38.6 years. 24.5% of residents were under the age of 18; 7.9% were between the ages of 18 and 24; 25.5% were from 25 to 44; 23.2% were from 45 to 64; and 18.7% were 65 years of age or older. The gender makeup of the village was 48.2% male and 51.8% female.

2000 census
As of the census of 2000, there were 3,691 people, 1,565 households, and 996 families living in the village. The population density was 997.1 people per square mile (385.2/km2). There were 1,702 housing units at an average density of 459.8 per square mile (177.6/km2). The racial makeup of the village was 96.75% White, 2.00% African American, 0.11% Native American, 0.30% Asian, 0.11% from other races, and 0.73% from two or more races. Hispanic or Latino of any race were 0.43% of the population.

There were 1,565 households, out of which 33.4% had children under the age of 18 living with them, 43.1% were married couples living together, 15.5% had a female householder with no husband present, and 36.3% were non-families. 32.7% of all households were made up of individuals, and 15.4% had someone living alone who was 65 years of age or older. The average household size was 2.30 and the average family size was 2.89.

In the village, the population was spread out, with 25.3% under the age of 18, 9.4% from 18 to 24, 27.7% from 25 to 44, 21.7% from 45 to 64, and 15.8% who were 65 years of age or older. The median age was 36 years. For every 100 females there were 83.6 males. For every 100 females age 18 and over, there were 80.1 males.

The median income for a household in the village was $29,807, and the median income for a family was $37,371. Males had a median income of $31,897 versus $19,634 for females. The per capita income for the village was $18,112. About 11.7% of families and 14.5% of the population were below the poverty line, including 18.2% of those under age 18 and 17.0% of those age 65 or over.

Education
Georgetown has a public library, a branch of the Brown County Public Library.

Arts and culture
President Ulysses S. Grant grew up and attended grade school in Georgetown. The school house is still in the town, where the locals refer to it as the Grant Schoolhouse. Also in Georgetown are Grant's childhood home and the tannery that his father owned across the street. All three are stops on the Land of Grant tour.

Being the county seat, Georgetown hosts the large Brown County Fair and parade which brings in thousands of patrons from other towns. The headstone of General Thomas L. Hamer is in the old cemetery located by the Brown County Fair Grounds.

Seventeen acres of the city was listed on the National Register of Historic Places in 1978 as the Georgetown Historic District.

Agriculture
Three Georgetown farmers committed suicide between 2015 and 2017, mostly due to their dire financial situations as a result of decreasing commodity prices. Over 450 farmers killed themselves across nine Midwestern states from 2014 to 2018.

Notable people
 Carr Van Anda, Managing Editor of the New York Times
 Electra Collins Doren, suffragette, library scientist
 Brian Grant, professional basketball player
 Ulysses S. Grant, President of the United States
 Jesse Root Grant, father of Ulysses S. Grant, settled in Georgetown, became Mayor of Georgetown in 1837
 Thomas L. Hamer, U.S. Congressman who fought in the Mexican–American War
 August V. Kautz, U.S. Army Major General
 Albert Kautz, U.S. Navy Rear Admiral
 Rodney J. McKinley, Chief Master Sergeant of the Air Force
 John Ruthven, wildlife artist

Gallery

References

External links

 Village website
 Brown County Fair

County seats in Ohio
Villages in Brown County, Ohio
1819 establishments in Ohio
Populated places established in 1819
Villages in Ohio